Two-time defending champion Esther Vergeer defeated Korie Homan in a rematch of the previous year's final, 6–2, 7–5 to win the women's singles wheelchair tennis title at the 2009 French Open.

Seeds
 Esther Vergeer (champion)
 Korie Homan (final)

Draw

Finals

External links
Draw

Wheelchair Women's Singles
French Open, 2009 Women's Singles